Kalvin Mark Phillips (born 2 December 1995) is an English professional footballer who plays as a midfielder for  club Manchester City and the England national team.

A Leeds United academy graduate, Phillips made his first-team debut in 2015. In the 2019–20 season, Phillips was a member of the Leeds team coached by Marcelo Bielsa that won the Championship. Following this season, Phillips made his international debut for the England national team, and was part of the England team that finished runner-up at UEFA Euro 2020.

Early life
Phillips was born in Leeds, West Yorkshire. He attended the Farnley Academy during his secondary school years.

Club career

Leeds United

Early career

Phillips played for local club Wortley from 2003 to 2010 before joining Leeds United's academy aged 14. He progressed through the club's youth ranks and signed his first professional deal with the club in the summer of 2014, retaining him for the 2014–15 season.

During the 2014–15 season, Phillips became the captain of the development and under-18 teams. Phillips joined the first team for the trip to Sunderland in the FA Cup third round on 4 January 2015; he was unused substitute in a 1–0 defeat. On 30 March, academy coach Jason Blunt said he felt Phillips would become a future fans favourite. Phillips made further appearances on the bench in league matches over the following months, and made his professional debut against Wolverhampton Wanderers in 4–3 defeat on 6 April. Along with Sam Byram, Charlie Taylor, Alex Mowatt and Lewis Cook, Phillips was the latest graduate of a promising group of academy players to regularly feature under former youth manager Neil Redfearn in the 2014–15 season. On 11 April, he retained his position in the Leeds starting 11, making his home debut against Cardiff City at Elland Road, and marked the match with his first senior goal in only his second appearance, although the match finished in a 2–1 defeat.

At the end of the season, he signed a new two-year contract. On 31 July 2015, Phillips was given the number 27 shirt for the upcoming 2015–16 season. However, with Redfearn replaced as head coach during the summer, Phillips made just 10 league appearances over the course of the season under head coaches Uwe Rösler and then Steve Evans.

2016 to 2019
In June 2016, only days after the appointment of new head coach Garry Monk, Phillips was offered a new three-year contract at Leeds. On 23 June, Phillips signed the new 3-year contract extension to stay at the club until the summer of 2019. On 27 August 2016, Phillips scored his first goal of the 2016–17 season, with a long-range free kick against Nottingham Forest in a 3–1 defeat. After an injury to captain Liam Bridcutt in September 2016, Phillips, alongside Eunan O'Kane or Ronaldo Vieira, established himself as an important player in Leeds' central midfield. Phillips' impressive form for Leeds saw him win the Championship Young Player of the Month Award for October 2016. On 9 December 2016, Phillips was given his first professional red card after giving away a penalty in a 2–0 defeat against then league leaders Brighton & Hove Albion by turning away a goal-bound shot with his arm, the penalty was converted by Glenn Murray.

On 6 August 2017, the opening day of the 2017–18 Championship season, Phillips scored a brace to ensure Leeds beat Bolton Wanderers 3–2. On 9 September he scored his third goal of the season in the match against Burton Albion. His fifth of the season came on 27 October in a 2–1 defeat in the Yorkshire derby against Sheffield United. He started the season partnering O'Kane in the centre of Leeds' midfield, although after a good start to the season, Leeds suffered a lack of form prior to the dismissal of head coach Thomas Christiansen in February 2018. Phillips and O'Kane found themselves in and out the team with Vieira given more opportunities and the arrival of Adam Forshaw in January 2018. Phillips ended the season with seven goals and three assists, which represented the best scoring season of his career so far.

On 19 July 2018, Phillips revealed he had been training as a centre-back and a deep-lying playmaker ahead of the 2018–19 season, as part of new head coach Marcelo Bielsa's tactics. As the season started, he was deployed as the holding midfielder in a 4–1–4–1 formation. Phillips was utilised as a deep-lying defensive midfielder for Leeds under Bielsa, playing as a centre-back if the team lined up in a three-man defence. In October 2018, his impressive form in his new positions under Bielsa's management saw Phillips briefly linked with a possible call up to Gareth Southgate's England national team. After a knee injury to captain Liam Cooper on 1 December 2018 in a 1–0 win against Sheffield United, Phillips deputised several matches playing as an outright centre-back until Cooper's return in mid-January. After returning to his defensive midfielder position, he scored his first goal of the season in Leeds' 1–1 draw against Middlesbrough on 9 February 2019, netting the equaliser in the 11th minute of injury time. In March 2019, he was selected to the 2018–19 Championship EFL Team of the Season and on 4 May 2019, Phillips was named the Yorkshire Evening Post Player of the Year for the 2018–19 season. During the 2018–19 season, Phillips made 46 appearances in all competitions, scoring one goal, after Leeds finished the regular season in third place. Leeds qualified for the play-offs, and Phillips started the fixtures against sixth-placed Derby County. Despite Leeds taking a 1–0 win away into the home leg, Leeds lost 4–2 in the second leg, with Leeds down to 10 men after the red card of Gaetano Berardi, and saw Derby progress to the final against Aston Villa 4–3 on aggregate.

2019 to 2022
In July 2019, Leeds opened contract talks with Phillips over a new contract. On 8 August 2019, it was revealed that Leeds had rejected bids for Phillips during the 2019 transfer window in order to keep him at the club, with bids for Phillips rejected at around £27 million. In September 2019, he signed a new five-year contract with Leeds. On Leeds United's centenary week, Phillips scored the winning goal against Birmingham City, with the match finishing 1–0 which took place in front of another large crowd at Elland Road. In November 2019, Phillips' Leeds form in defensive midfield under Marcelo Bielsa saw calls for him to be called up to the England squad. England manager Gareth Southgate watched Phillips in January 2020 ahead of a possible call up. After the English football season was paused in March 2020 due to the impact of the COVID-19 pandemic, the season was resumed during June. Phillips would go on to score a free kick in Leeds' 3–1 win over Blackburn Rovers on 4 July 2020, however his season would be ended just a week later following a knee injury picked up in the 1–0 win over Swansea City. Despite this, Leeds would shortly go on to be promoted to the Premier League as champions when a 1–0 victory over Barnsley was followed by both West Bromwich Albion and Brentford losing their matches. On 7 August, he was named in The Guardians Championship Team of the Season for 2019–20. On 8 September 2020, Phillips was named in the Professional Footballers' Association's 2019–20 Championship Team of the Season.

On 12 September 2020, Phillips made his first appearance in the Premier League in the opening game of the season in the 4–3 defeat against reigning Premier League champions Liverpool at Anfield, with Phillips gaining an assist for Jack Harrison's goal.

On 8 February 2021, Phillips made his 200th appearance for Leeds in a 2–0 win over Crystal Palace, joining a select group of just 70 players that have made over 200 appearances for the club, including then current teammates Stuart Dallas and Liam Cooper who also hit the milestone that season.

In the last game of the season on 23 May 2021, Phillips scored his first Premier League goal, a free kick in Leeds' 3–1 win over West Bromwich Albion.

Manchester City
Phillips signed for Premier League champions Manchester City on 4 July 2022 on a six-year contract, for a reported initial fee of £42 million, potentially rising to £45 million in add-ons. On 7 August, Phillips made his league debut after coming on as a substitute for Rodri in a 2–0 away win over West Ham United. Phillips though suffered from injury problems and underwent surgery on his shoulder in September. When he returned from the World Cup in mid December 2022, manager Pep Guardiola commented that Phillips was overweight.

International career

Phillips was eligible to play for his country of birth, England, as well as Jamaica and the Republic of Ireland through his heritage. He ultimately chose to represent England and was called by Gareth Southgate for the first time in August 2020, before receiving his first cap on 8 September versus Denmark in the UEFA Nations League. He was only the third player in the 21st century to represent England prior to making an appearance in the top division of a country, after Jack Butland and Wilfried Zaha. In an interview after being called up, Phillips spoke of his intention to give his first England shirt to Marcelo Bielsa after the Leeds United manager handed him a playing shirt from his old club Newell's Old Boys, along with a message to him and his family to commemorate his first international call-up.

Phillips was chosen to represent England at UEFA Euro 2020, where he won praise from pundits, fans and the world's press for his combative, dynamic displays. He started every game that England played during the tournament all the way up to the final, where they were eventually beaten on penalties by tournament winners Italy. Phillips was named England's 2020–21 Men's Player of the Year. He made two substitute appearances at the 2022 World Cup in Qatar.

Style of play
After starting his career as a box-to-box or central midfielder, Phillips was converted into a defensive midfielder by Marcelo Bielsa before the start of the 2018–19 season. He is known for his range of short sharp passing, long ball distribution and ability to start attacks whilst covering his defensive duties, with him described as a 'lynchpin'.

Marcelo Bielsa described his style "He's very good at getting the ball and putting it into another space, a better space. He's very good when he has to cover the team when our full-backs go in attack. And when we are outnumbered, he is very good with his defending." Phillips was also converted into playing as a centre back under Bielsa.

For his similar style of play, Phillips was given the nickname "Yorkshire Pirlo" by Leeds fans in homage to Andrea Pirlo. Following his performance for England against Croatia at the Euro 2020, he was described as “brilliant at finding little pockets of space that turn a simple passing move into a dangerous attack.”

Career statistics

Club

International

Honours
Leeds United
EFL Championship: 2019–20

England
UEFA European Championship runner-up: 2020

Individual
EFL Young Player of the Month: October 2016
EFL Championship Team of the Year: 2018–19
PFA Team of the Year: 2019–20 Championship
England Men's Player of the Year: 2020–21

References

External links

Profile at the Manchester City F.C. website
Profile at the Football Association website

1995 births
Living people
Footballers from Leeds
English footballers
Association football midfielders
Leeds United F.C. players
Manchester City F.C. players
English Football League players
Premier League players
England international footballers
UEFA Euro 2020 players
2022 FIFA World Cup players
Black British sportsmen
English people of Irish descent
English people of Jamaican descent